Andrés Felipe Valencia Ambuila (born 15 January 1991) is a Colombian footballer who plays as an attacking midfielder for Margarita.

References

1991 births
Living people
Colombian footballers
Association football midfielders
América de Cali footballers
Bogotá FC footballers
People from Tolima Department